Keith Francis Wylie (29 March 1945 – 1 November 1999) was a croquet player from England.

Keith Wylie won the President's Cup twice (1967 and 1977), the Open Championship twice (1970 and 1971) and the Men's Championship in 1968.
Wylie represented Great Britain in two MacRobertson Shield tournaments, winning on both occasions.

In 1985, Wylie wrote the definitive book on Croquet Tactics with a second edition appearing in 1991.
In 2008, Wylie was inducted into the World Croquet Federation Hall of Fame.

Works
 Expert Croquet Tactics (KF Wylie, 1985).
 Expert Croquet Tactics (Eastern Rose Publishing, 1991). .

References

External links
The Croquet Records website

1945 births
1999 deaths
English croquet players